Dr. Balji Nath Pandit (1916–2007) was a Sanskrit scholar and authority of Kashmir Shaivaism.

He obtained his Ph.D. at Punjab University and was  professor of Sanskrit and Philosophy at Himachal Pradesh University. He was honored for his work by the President of India, and was also on the Muktabodha Indological Research Institute Academic Council.

In 1999 he was on the panel of "Seminar on Kashmir Shaivaism". He died on 7 September 2007.

Works

Articles 
 Sahib Kaul's Flash of Self-Realization, Koshur Samachar, Kashmir News Network

References 

1916 births
Sanskrit writers
Kashmiri Shaivites
2007 deaths
Kashmiri writers